Shachi may refer to:

Shachi (Sanskrit: शची, IAST: Śacī), also known as Indrani (Sanskrit: इन्द्राणी, IAST: Indrāṇī), a Hindu goddess
Shachi (鯱) or shachihoko (鯱鉾 / 鯱), an animal in Japanese folklore with the head of a tiger and the body of a carp
Team Shachi, formerly Team Syachihoko (チームしゃちほこ)  a Japanese female idol group 
Shachi-class offshore patrol vessel, Indian patrol boat project scrapped after delay
Shachi Pai (born 10 October 1998)  an Indian-born woman cricketer who currently plays for Derbyshire